Mosiro may be:

Mosiro people
Mosiro language

Language and nationality disambiguation pages